John Palmer Fishwick Jr. (born 1957) is an attorney in Roanoke, Virginia who served as U.S. Attorney for the Western District of Virginia.

Born in Roanoke, Virginia, John is a graduate of Harvard College. He graduated in 1979. Fishwick furthered his education at Washington and Lee University, graduating from the law school in 1983.

Fishwick worked in private practice for nearly thirty years before being nominated by President Barack Obama to the position of U.S. Attorney. While the highest-ranking law enforcement officer in the District, Fishwick dedicated his time to the prosecution of violent criminals and potential solutions to a growing heroin epidemic. He resigned on January 6, 2017.

After leaving the position, he began working in private practice again at his newly created firm, Fishwick & Associates in downtown Roanoke.  Fishwick led the efforts to rename tennis courts in Roanoke after Carnis Poindexter, an African American tennis trailblazer from Roanoke.  Fishwick also led the charge to stop the excessive pay for the chief executive officer of CSX Corporation.

John's Father, John Fishwick Sr., was a railroad executive and prominent community leader in Roanoke.  The John P. Fishwick Middle School was recently renamed for him.

References 

1957 births
Living people
People from Roanoke, Virginia
Harvard College alumni
Virginia lawyers
United States Attorneys for the Western District of Virginia
Washington and Lee University School of Law alumni
Virginia Democrats